The Tanka movement was a militant agrarian struggle on behalf of the Hajong tribal people in Mymensingh District, East Bengal (initially in India, later East Pakistan) 1942–1950. The movement was parallel, but distinct from, the Tebhaga movement in other parts of Bengal. The Hajong movement was inspired by the struggles of Moni Singh.

Bengali communist cadres had arrived in the Hajong areas in the 1930s, and helped to organise the Hajong peasants. During the period of 1942 and 1945, Hajong sharecroppers organized in the Kisan Sabha struggled against feudal domination of Bengali Hindu landlords. There was a severe crackdown against the movement in 1946. The Hajong then turned to guerrilla struggles. By the time of independence of Pakistan, the Hajong guerrillas operating along the Indo-Pakistani border were well organised.

Hajong armed communist rebels captured control over a number of villages and set up their own administration there. The Hajong rebels were led by Lulit Surkuhr Hajong and Podmolohchon Surkuhr Hajong. After being confronted by the Pakistani Army, the rebels built up a base in Baghmara, Garo Hills on the Indian side of the border. For some time they conducted frequent cross-border raids against Pakistani police parties. Additional Pakistani police forces were sent to the area, patrolling the entire border area of the Mymensingh District.

The Pakistani state forces conducted a violent campaign of repression against the Hajong people, and most Hajongs left Pakistan for India. Pakistani authorities claimed that "almost all" of the Hajong refugees were communist sympathizers, a claim that was used to motivate the expropriation of their households and lands. These lands were sold to Bengali Muslim refugees from India at low rates.

The rebels eventually settled down permanently in India. Lulit Surkuhr Hajong founded a branch of the Communist Party of India in the Garo Hills, whilst Podmolohchon Surkuhr Hajong founded a branch of the same party in the Khasi Hills along with Ruh'imohon Hajong and Chondromohan Hajong.

References

Communist Party of India
Mymensingh District
Rebellions in Asia
Debt bondage in South Asia
Mymensingh